The Garden City Hotel is a  hotel in Garden City, New York. The first incarnation was built in 1874 by A.T. Stewart and the current fourth incarnation was built in 1983 by the late Myron Nelkin.  It is famous for having hosted many world leaders and celebrities, including John F. Kennedy, Margaret Thatcher, Hillary Clinton, George H. W. Bush, Prince Khalid of Saudi Arabia, and Irish Taoiseach Garret FitzGerald. Charles Lindbergh, rented a room at the hotel the night before his famous transatlantic flight to Paris, although he did not actually use it, instead taking a three-hour nap at the home of his friend on 105 Third Street.

History

The original Garden City Hotel first started construction in the fall of 1873 and was opened to great fanfare on July 30, 1874.  It was built by millionaire Alexander Turney Stewart and cost $150,000 to build. The original hotel was later redesigned and expanded.

A new Garden City Hotel was opened in 1895, designed by architects McKim, Mead and White.  A nine-hole golf course was opened for guests in May 1897, which later became the Garden City Golf Club. Four years after the opening of the new hotel, it burned down on the morning of September 7, 1899.  A third and most famous incarnation of the hotel was opened on the same site in 1901, and was a host to the elite families of society such as the Vanderbilts and Pierpont Morgans.  It continued to be so until it declared bankruptcy and was demolished in 1973 to make way for the present Garden City Hotel, which opened on May 20, 1983.

It was reported in October 2007 that the Nelkin family was exploring the sale of the hotel several months after the death of its owner, Myron Nelkin. The hotel was sold in September 2012 to Morris Moinian of The Fortuna Realty Group. The property underwent a $30 million renovation which included 269 guest rooms and suites, a new facade and a 7,000 square foot spa, which is under construction.

The Garden City Hotel is a member of the Preferred Hotel Group (Preferred Hotels and Resorts Worldwide).

References

External links
 Garden City Hotel (Official Website)
 Architectural sketches of the second Garden City Hotel

Garden City Hotel
Hotels in New York (state)
History of New York (state)